Latin Patriarch may refer to these Catholic sees and/or titles :

Catholic counter-claimants to the titles of the Pentarchy 
 Latin Patriarch of Constantinople (suppressed)
 Latin Patriarch of Antioch (suppressed)
 Latin Patriarch of Alexandria (suppressed)
 Latin Patriarch of Jerusalem
 Latin Patriarch of Ethiopia (suppressed)

Other Patriarch(ate)s of the Latin Church 
 Patriarch of Venice
 Patriarch of Lisbon
 Patriarch of the East Indies (vested in Goa)
 Patriarch of Aquileia (extinct)
 Patriarch of Grado (merged with the office of the Bishop of Castello to become the Patriarch of Venice)
 Patriarch of the West Indies (extinct)

Patriarch of Rome and all the West and Patriarch of the West are two rarely mentioned titles of the Pope. Catholicism also recognizes the patriarchs of the East, but they would never be called "Latin."